Lokagrani Adv. Balwantrao Ragav alias Balasaheb Deshmukh (born 27 March 1878 at Chandrapur - died 18 November 1957) was one of the political leaders who become famous not only in Chandrapur but also in whole vidharbha by his imbibed qualities and devotion. He was a prominent leader of Tilak era.

Education
He studied at Chandrapur for his primary and pre secondary education. There after he shifted to Nagpur for his High school and his college education. He took his law degree from Calcutta University in 1899. The then British government offered him a post of a Judge, however he refused to accept the same and started legal profession on 29 October 1900 at Chandrapur and became a renowned lawyer in Vidharbha and Maharashtra.

Politics
Balwantrao never intended to be solely a lawyer, and hence he entered the Indian independence movement and became active in politics. He imbibed the aspiration of freedom in the minds of the people and awoke them to fight against the British raj. He accepted the leadership of Lokmanya Balgangadhar Tilak and admired him to be his political leader and guru. He always called Lokmanya Tilak as Bhagawan Tilak. He propagated the ideology of Lokmanya Tilak and called on the people to accept his principles of Swadeshi, Bycot, Swarajya and National Education.

In 1906 he attended the annual session of Indian National Congress held under the President-ship of the then political leader Shri. Dadabhai naurojee along with Adv. Nilkantharao Sadaphal, Adv. Dajiba Ganesh Dewaikar and Dajishrashtri Chandekar. He also used to observe the Ganesh jayanti and Chhatrapati Shivaji maharaj jayanti in order to assemble the people and propagate the idea of Independence among the people.

Lokmanaya Tilak had visited Chandrapur for attending the Providential Sessions of his Swaraj party in 1918. He stayed in the house of Balwantrao Deshmukh. After his heroic welcome by the people, Balwantrao gave a dinner in honour of Lokmanay Tilak and other political leaders Viz Dadasaheb Khaperday, Nikalhantrao Khadilkar and N.H Kelkar and Others, Who came to attain the provincial session at Chandrapur. During the evening time Lokmamaya Tilak addressed the people of Chandrapur. The session lasted for 3 days and during this period Chandrapur became the center place of the whole province in respect of the political activities.

Prior to that, after his release from Mandale Prison in 1914, Lokmanya Tilak formed his Swaraj party and held its session at Belgaon, which was also attended among the other prominent leaders including Balwantrao Deshmukh, who was then considered to be a very close and faithful associate of Lokmanaya Tilak. In 1919 when Lokmamya Tilak left Mumbai for his tour to England, Balwantrao Deshmukh was one of those 10 Leaders who were given a permission to see off Balwantrao at the deck of the ship which was bound for a voyage to London.

In the year 1917, Dr. Annie Besant started the Home Rule League Movement in India. Balwantrao actively supported this movement and propagated the ideology of this movement in Chandrapur and Vidharbha.

After the sad demise of Lokmanya Tilak, Mahatma Gandhi took the political charge of the freedom movement and unanimously decided to launch the Non - cooperative movement in India against British rule. Balwantrao Deshmukh supported the same and along with some other lawyers of Chandrapur, boycotted the Court for about 1 year.

In the Year 1919-20 Balwantrao was Unanimously selected as president C.P. and Berar Congress Committee. During his tenure he held four sessions of providential committee at distinct places. Mahatma Gandhi attended one such sessions held under the presidency of Balawantrao Deshmukh. During the period 1919 to 1923 Balwantrao Deshmukh was a member of All India Congress Committee. In 1921 he was elected as a member of the Provincial assembly and thus worked as M.L.A. for about 5 years.

Work as a lawyer
He was a very clever and famous Lawyer in whole of Maharashtra for conducting criminal Cases. Because of his efforts the political leaders like Pandit Motilal Nehru, Bhai Parmanandanji, Sir Tegbahhadur Sapru, V.D Sawarkar, Kahnayalala Munshi, Br. Nirmal Chandra Chatterjee, Dr. Narang, Dharmaveer Bhopatkar, Pandit Ravishankar Shukla, Br. N.V Gadgil, Jayantrao tilak had visited Chandrapur.

In the year 1942 during the "Quit India Movement" the people of Chimur thesil Chandrapur assembled in front of Police Station Chimur under the leadership of Rashtra Sant Tukodaji Maharaj. The people attacked the police station and burned some of the policeman. The area of Chimur was free from British rule for about four days. The British army came to Chimur and took charge of the area. They arrested many people under the charges of unlawful assembly, arson and Decoity. A special court was created at Chandrapur for trying the accused persons. Balwantrao arranged to defend all the political accused and further arranged for the residence of the relatives of the accused during their trial in the Court by erecting a pendol in front of his house and made necessary arrangements of their residence and food. Some of the accused were convicted. Their appeals came to be filed before Nagpur High Court. Till then the India got Independence and hence all the accused being political prisnors were pardoned.

Honours
Balawantrao Deshmukh founded Lokmanya Tilak Smarak Mandal at Chandrapur and got constructed the building of Lokmanya Tilak Vidyalaya, which is considered to be a monument of Lokmanya Tilak in Chandrapur. For the inauguration of the building Balwantrao invited Br. N.V. Gadgil and Br. Jayantrao tilak who was the grandson of Lokmanaya Tilak.

In the year 1956 he formed a local committee for awakening the people and giving active support to tho Goa freedom movement. Four youth from Chandrapur decided to take part in the freedom struggle of Goa. One of the youth namely Baburao Thorat was assassinated by Portuguese soldiers as they tried to enter the territory. Balwantrao caused to bring the asthi kalash of Baburao Thorat to Chandrapur and respectfully got those buried in Maulana Azad garden of Chandrapur and erected a Stambh over the same.

Prior to that in the year 1937 the then Manciple committee honored Balwantrao Deshmukh on his 60th birthday by giving him a Testimonial. Balwantrao was a very merciful, kindhearted and benevolent person. He never made any distinction between rich and poor, educated and Uneducated, Touchable and untouchable, higher quality and lower quality and treated all the people equally. He had a natural love for poor and Down Trodden people. He was the president of Choka Mela hostel till his death, which was meant for the education of the youth from poor and down Trodden families. He monitored and helped many societies, orphanages, asylums etc. He died at the edge of 80 years on 18 November 1957. Because of his death the people thought as if they have lost their well wisher and a near friend.

References 

1878 births
1957 deaths
Indian independence activists from Maharashtra
20th-century Indian lawyers